Louis A. Kirouac (born May 17, 1940) is a former American football player who played for New York Giants, Baltimore Colts and Atlanta Falcons of the National Football League (NFL). He played college football at Boston College.

References

1940 births
Living people
Sportspeople from Manchester, New Hampshire
Players of American football from New Hampshire
American football offensive guards
American football offensive tackles
American football placekickers
Boston College Eagles football players
New York Giants players
Baltimore Colts players
Atlanta Falcons players